HMS E50 was a British E class submarine built by John Brown, Clydebank. She was launched on 13 November 1916 and was commissioned on 23 January 1917. E50 was damaged in a collision with the Imperial German Navy submarine UC-62 while submerged in the North Sea off the North Hinder Light Vessel on 19 March 1917.
E 50 was lost on 1 February 1918, and it was earlier believed that she struck a mine in the North Sea off the South Dogger Light Vessel. In 2011 the wreck was found by a Danish Expedition much closer to the Danish coast, 65 NM west of Nymindegab.

Design
She was powered by two  Vickers eight-cylinder two-stroke diesel engines and two  electric motors.

E50 was armed with a 12-pounder  QF gun mounted forward of the conning tower. She had five 18 inch (450 mm) torpedo tubes, two in the bow, one either side amidships, and one in the stern; a total of 10 torpedoes were carried.

E-Class submarines had wireless systems with  power ratings; in some submarines, these were later upgraded to  systems by removing a midship torpedo tube. Their maximum design depth was  although in service some reached depths of below . Some submarines contained Fessenden oscillator systems.

Salvage and commemoration
   
The conning tower from E 50 was in a very bad state, when it was rediscovered by a Danish expedition in 2011.The tower was already torn off the hull and was laying isolated on the seabed, seriously damaged by heavy fishing gear. The Danish team decided to raise the remnants in order to prevent complete destruction, and could do so in compliance with international law.

Afterwards the tower went through a very comprehensive restoration, and since 2015 it has been on display at Sea War Museum Jutland in Thyborøn, where also the 31 men, who lost their life in the submarine, are commemorated on a plaque in front of the tower.

References

Bibliography
 
 

 

British E-class submarines of the Royal Navy
Ships built on the River Clyde
1916 ships
World War I submarines of the United Kingdom
Maritime incidents in 1917
Maritime incidents in 1918
Ships sunk by mines
World War I shipwrecks in the North Sea
Royal Navy ship names